EGSM may refer to:

 Beccles Airport, ICAO code.
 E-GSM, an extension of the GSM-900 frequency range.